In algebraic topology, Steenrod homology is a homology theory for compact metric spaces introduced by , based on regular cycles.
It is similar to the homology theory introduced rather sketchily by Andrey Kolmogorov in 1936.

References

Homology theory